The Henry Art Gallery ("The Henry") is a contemporary art museum located on the University of Washington campus in Seattle, Washington. Located on the west edge of the university's campus along 15th Avenue N.E. in the University District, it was founded in February, 1927, and was the first public art museum in the state of Washington. The original building was designed by Bebb and Gould. The addition/expansion was designed by Gwathmey Siegel & Associates Architects.

Founder
The museum was named for Horace C. Henry, the local businessman who donated money for its founding, as well as a collection of paintings he had begun collecting in the 1890s after visiting the Chicago World's Fair. Henry donated the collection he built with his late wife Susan of 178 works of art, along with funds for construction, and the Henry Art Gallery opened to the public on February 10, 1927. Some years prior, Henry had added gallery space to his own home on Capitol Hill, and from 1917 until the foundation of the Henry Gallery, he effectively operated a wing of his home as a free museum, open to the public 10 hours a week. In contrast to Charles and Emma Frye of Seattle's Frye Art Museum, Henry made no effort to control the future of the museum he financed; indeed, he specifically disavowed any such intention.

Exhibitions
The Henry's exhibition program is largely devoted to contemporary art and the history of photography. Major exhibitions have included Ann Hamilton: the common S E N S E (Oct 2014), Katinka Bock: A and I (2013), Maya Lin (2006), Lynn Hershman Leeson (2005–06), Doug Aitken (2005), James Turrell (2003), and group exhibitions such as W.O.W. - The Work of the Work, 2004–05, which explored contemporary art's appeal to non-visual senses and the body of the viewer.

Collection
The Henry's collection includes over 28,000 objects. The collection includes holdings in photography, both historical and contemporary, due to the partial gift and purchase of the Joseph and Elaine Monsen collection. In 1982, the Henry inherited a sizable collection from the University of Washington's former Costume and Textile Study Center. The Henry also holds a James Turrell Skyspace, a site-specific immersive sculpture finished in 2003. Like the Seattle baseball stadium, the Skyspace has a retractable roof.

The Henry has made their collections available for research and general public interest by providing in-house and online public access though the Eleanor Henry Reed Collection Study Center and the online collections database. These resources allow students and the general public to explore collections for personal or professional research. Objects in the collection can be accessed on-site, by reservation only, through the Reed Collection Study Center or academic classes, adult study groups, and researchers.

Brink Award
The Brink Award was a biennial art award for an emerging artist from Washington, Oregon, or British Columbia worth $12,500. The award was established in 2008 and is administered by the Henry Art Gallery.

Past award winners 
 Isabelle Pauwels (2009)
 Andrew Dadson (2011)
 Anne Fenton (2013)
 Jason Hirata (2015)
 Demian DinéYazhi' (2017)

References

External links

Official site
Archives of the Northwest Art Project, oral histories of artists and others important to the Northwest art scene initiated by the Henry Art Gallery - University of Washington Digital Collections

1927 establishments in Washington (state)
Art museums established in 1927
Art museums and galleries in Washington (state)
Institutions accredited by the American Alliance of Museums
Museums in Seattle
University museums in Washington (state)
University of Washington campus